The Ink Black Heart is a crime fiction novel by the English author J. K. Rowling, written under the pseudonym Robert Galbraith. It is the sixth and the longest novel in the Cormoran Strike series.

Plot
After Strike and Robin visit the Ritz for Robin's 30th birthday, Strike attempts to kiss Robin; she evades the kiss. Feeling rebuffed, Strike starts a relationship with Madeline, an acquaintance of his ex-fiancée Charlotte, a relationship he keeps secret from Robin.
 
Edie Ledwell, an animator who co-created the successful cartoon The Ink Black Heart on YouTube and which is now being adapted into a film on Netflix, visits the agency. She asks Robin to investigate the identity of Anomie, an online figure who co-created Drek's Game, an online game based on the cartoon, and started harassing Edie after she criticised the game. Robin refers Edie to another agency with more cybercrime experience. Within the game, two moderators appear to have a dossier of proof that Anomie and Edie are the same. They share this with Josh Blay, the other co-creator of The Ink Black Heart and Edie's ex-boyfriend. Soon afterwards, Edie and Josh are tasered and stabbed while meeting in Highgate Cemetery, the cartoon's setting. Edie dies while Josh is paralysed.
 
The agency is hired to investigate Anomie's identity by a film producer seeking to adapt The Ink Black Heart. They investigate various individuals associated with the cartoon and the North Grove Art Collective. Much of the investigation takes place online with the detectives investigating Anomie's abuse and another figure, The Pen of Justice, who criticised the cartoon for being racist, ableist and transphobic. They also investigate Drek's Game, where Anomie openly confesses to the murder, something treated as a joke by the other moderators, including its co-creator Morehouse. Two moderators appear to be associated with the Halvening, the far-right group that compiled the dossier with fake proof and the police suspect committed the murder. Robin accesses the game and becomes an active player. Robin and Strike attempt to eliminate suspects by carrying out surveillance and examining who is otherwise engaged while Anomie is active in the game. They also receive phone calls telling them to exhume Edie's grave and open letters buried with her. In the game, Paperwhite, another moderator, and Morehouse appear to have a relationship, with Paperwhite sending a racy picture to Morehouse and including Anomie by accident.
 
After leaving Comic Con where Robin interviewed Yasmin, the former employee of Edie and Josh, they follow a suspicious individual, only for a man dressed as Batman to push him onto tracks as a train approaches. After Robin helps save his life, her photograph appears in the newspapers. It is revealed that she saved Oliver Peach, the moderator Vilepechora in Drek's Game and member of the Halvening. In the game, Anomie confesses this crime to Oliver's brother, LordDrek, before banning him from the game. Soon afterwards, a parcel bomb damages the office, although nobody is injured. The publicity causes Morehouse to discuss going to the agency with Paperwhite. Robin is able to speak to the moderator Fiendy1 on a personal level and discovers she is Edie's cousin. She is able to provide the identity of Morehouse and Strike and Robin decide to interview him, but Morehouse is murdered before they reach him.
 
Strike interviews Yasmin himself and discovers that she was being blackmailed by Anomie to log in as them on several occasions, rendering much of their work to eliminate suspects moot. Robin also receives the picture that was supposedly send by Paperwhite to Anomie and is able to trace the girl to a Glasgow art student. They then figure out Paperwhite was a sock puppet account controlled by Anomie to keep tabs on Morehouse and the other moderators. She then receives a phone call, threatening to kill her. Strike realizes that Edie's uncle did not bury Josh's letter with Edie. After reading misogynistic abuse in the letter, they deduce  someone with access to Katya, Josh's agent, replaced the original letter.
 
Soon afterwards, Katya's daughter calls them, screaming for help. After driving to Katya's house, Gus, Katya's son, now revealed as Anomie, tasers Strike. Robin sets off a rape alarm before fleeing upstairs, where she sees Gus's father's corpse. A machete-wielding Gus pursues her until he is distracted by neighbors alerted by Robin's alarm, allowing her to hit him in the back of the head.
 
In hospital afterwards, Strike tells Robin that her name has been added to the office door, which brings her to tears, and that he has broken up with Madeline. Robin, who believed he was still dating Madeline, reveals she is now dating the officer, Ryan Murphy. After she leaves, Strike reflects that he may have missed his chance to date Robin.

Characters

Main
 Cormoran Strike – A private detective. He is a minor celebrity, thanks in part to his rock star father and his solving of high-profile murders. He is also a war veteran.
 Robin Ellacott – Strike's former assistant, now business partner, trained in criminal investigation. She is a survivor of a rape and attempted murder.

Recurring
 Pat Chauncey – The agency's office manager.
 Sam Barclay – A contract investigator.
 Charlotte Campbell Ross – Strike's ex-girlfriend.
 Michelle "Midge" Greenstreet - A contract investigator.
 Dev Shah - A Contract investigator
 Madeline Courson-Miles - Strike's new girlfriend.

Offline characters
 Edie Ledwell – Co-creator of The Ink Black Heart, a successful cartoon started on YouTube and about to be made into a film. She is abused online by Anomie and other fans before her murder and is also criticised for being racist, ableist and transphobic by the Pen of Justice.
 Josh Blay – The former boyfriend of Ledwell who was also the co-creator of The Ink Black Heart. He does not receive the same abuse as Edie.
 Grant Ledwell - Edie's uncle who wishes to carry on Edie's desire to create a movie version of The Ink Black Heart after her death. 
 Rachel Ledwell - Grant's daughter and cousin to Edie. She is the moderator Fiendy1 in Drek's Game and is able to provide vital information to Robin on who the co-creator Morehouse is. 
 Seb Montgomery – An animator on the first few episodes of The Ink Black Heart who Edie suspects of being Anomie.
 Wally Cardew – Josh's friend who voiced Drek in The Ink Black Heart until Edie fired him over a video mocking the holocaust. He runs his own YouTube channel.
 Preston 'Pez' Pierce – A digital artist who voiced Magspie in the early episodes of The Ink Black Heart and a resident of North Grove Art Collective. He models for Mariam's classes.
 Tim Ashcroft – A former actor who voiced the Worm in the early episodes of The Ink Black Heart who now runs a theatre group that works with schools.
 Zoe Haigh – An artist with the collective and fan of The Ink Black Heart. She is the moderator Worm28 in Drek's Game.
 Philip Ormond - Edie's boyfriend at the time of the murder who is also collaborating with Yasmin, Edie's former employee, on a book about The Ink Black Heart.
 Yasmin Weatherhead - former employee of Edie and Josh. She is the moderator Hartella in Drek's Game and is working with Phillip Ormond to write a book about the cartoon and online game. Anomie is able to keep her quiet by threatening her with going to the police about her interactions with members of the Halvening. 
 Nils de Jong and Mariam Torosyan - Owners of the North Grove Art Collective, the establishment where Edie, Josh, Tim, Katya and the rest of the people associated with The Ink Black Heart met. 
 Kea Niven - former girlfriend of Josh who claims Edie stole her idea for The Ink Black Heart. 
 Katya Upcott – Josh's agent and Edie's former agent.
 Inigo Upcott – Katya's husband, a gifted musician forced to retire due to myalgic encephalomyelitis.
 Gus Upcott – Katya and Inigo's adult son, a gifted musician who is bullied by his father.
 Flavia Upcott - Katya and Inigo's 12 year old daughter, who is treated poorly by both parents.
 Ryan Murphy - a local CID officer called to the agency for Robin's account of her meeting with Edie Ledwell, who later shows a romantic interest in her.

Online characters
 
 Anomie – A co-creator and moderator of Drek's Game, who persecutes Edie after a video is released in which she said she did not like the game.
 Morehouse – A co-creator and moderator of Drek's Game and the online identity of Dr Vikas Bhardwaj. Unlike Anomie, he does not attack Edie online.
 Vilepechora and LordDrek – Oliver and Charlie Peach, members of the Halvening and moderators who compile a dossier purporting to prove Anomie is Edie prior to her death. They provide this dossier to Hartella.
 Paperwhite – A moderator who is in an online relationship with Morehouse but is later revealed to be a fake account of Anomie.
 Fiendy1 - A moderator who believes Anomie is dangerous and later agrees to speak with Robin.
 Hartella - A moderator who claims to have proof Edie is Anomie, but was in reality being manipulated by members of the Halvening. She later admits to Strike she was the person pretending to be Anomie on his orders.
 Worm28 - A moderator of Drek's Game who struggles with dyslexia.

Reception
The Ink Black Heart sold 50,738 copies in its first week on sale in the UK, placing it first on the UK Official Top 50 book sales list.

Jake Kerridge from The Daily Telegraph rated the book 3 out of 5 stars, describing the series as a whole as "good comforting crime fiction", but criticising The Ink Black Heart for its length, stating it "[does not] seem to have more depth, or to cover more emotional territory, than the earlier ones did". The author Mark Sanderson, writing in The Times, similarly criticised the length.

Kirkus Reviews called the book "[a]n overblown whodunit", citing length and extensive focus on online conversations as reasons to skip it. They concluded the review by saying "[a]fter a thousand pages ... the reader is likely to no longer care" who the murderer is. Darragh McManus from Irish Independent gave the book a positive review, praising it for "dozens of characters, multiple plotlines and, most crucially, lots and lots of things going on".

Outside of the length, the novel was mainly criticised, as well as widely mocked and derided on social media, for alleged self-insertion. The plot, in which a woman is killed after being accused of transphobia (among other -isms and -phobias), drew many comparisons to Rowling's real life previous controversial comments surrounding transgender people. Rowling denied the claims that the book was inspired by her own controversies, stating, "I had written the book before certain things happened to me online".

References

2022 British novels
Cormoran Strike series
LGBT-related controversies in literature
Internet-related controversies
Mulholland Books books